Danis Luis Quintero Chevans (born 10 December 1984 in Cienfuegos, Cienfuegos Province) is a Cuban footballer, who is currently playing for German amateur side FSV Rheinfelden.

Club career
Quintero began play with FC Cienfuegos and played eight years for the team before fleeing the country. After a trial with Swiss side Servette he signed for C.A. Valdevez in summer 2009. After a half-year in Portugal, he left Valdevez in February 2010 to sign on 2 February 2010 for the German lower League club SV Nollingen.

In 2013 he joined FSV Rheinfelden.

International career
He made his international debut for Cuba in a January 2007 Caribbean Cup qualification match against Guadeloupe and has earned a total of 7 caps, scoring no goals.

During 2010 FIFA World Cup qualification campaign he played four matches. He was part of the under-20 national team in the qualification for the 2003 FIFA World Youth Championship. He was part of the Cuba national football team at 2007 Caribbean Nations Cup and back-up keeper at 2007 CONCACAF Gold Cup.

His final international was a December 2008 Caribbean Cup qualification match against Guadeloupe.

Personal life

Defection to Germany
Nicknamed Pulpo (The Octopus), Quintero disappeared from the national team at Frankfurt Airport or Düsseldorf Airport in July 2009 after a friendly match against German Bundesliga side SC Freiburg. After spending time in Switzerland and Portugal he returned to Germany and received a political refugee status after a few months.

References

1984 births
Living people
People from Cienfuegos
Defecting Cuban footballers
Association football goalkeepers
Cuban footballers
Cuba international footballers
FC Cienfuegos players
2007 CONCACAF Gold Cup players
Cuban expatriate footballers
Expatriate footballers in Portugal
Cuban expatriate sportspeople in Portugal
Expatriate footballers in Germany
Cuban expatriate sportspeople in Germany